The Italian Bridge is the bridge across the Griboedov Canal in Saint Petersburg, Russia. It is a single span, steel, pedestrian bridge next to Italian street (hence the name). The bridge's length is 19.66 meters, the width is 3 meters.

History
The bridge was built in 1896 in the place of a boat ferry as a single span wooden bridge which connected Big and Little Italian streets. The engineer L.N. Kolpitsin was author of the project. The novelty at the time was use of xilolit plates as a paving material. In 1902 the bridge was rebuilt for the first time, and around 1911-1912 it was rebuilt again.
After quarter of century, in 1937 the bridge went through the capital reconstruction, in order to fit two termal pipes into it. In 1955 during the renovation of Griboedov Canal embankments the bridge was completely rebuilt again. Since then it has its modern look.

Bridges in Saint Petersburg
Bridges completed in 1896
Bridges completed in 1955
1896 establishments in the Russian Empire
Cultural heritage monuments of regional significance in Saint Petersburg